The siege of Ankara was an inconclusive siege of Ankara by Timur.

From Sivas, Timur's army marched to Ankara in twelve days.
The lead contingents of Timur's army encountered a force led by Yakub Bey and defeated them. Timur arrived later with the main force. 

The Ottoman sultan, Bayezid, hearing of Timur's invasion, raised his siege of Constantinople and forced marched his army toward Ankara.

Upon hearing Bayezid's army was nine miles away, Timur, whose temporary siege had consisted of diverting the city's water supply and undermining the city walls, quickly moved his army into defensive positions behind a ditch. It was from this defensive position Timur waited for Bayezid to attack.

References

External links 

Battles involving the Timurid Empire
Ankara